The 2021 Atlantic 10 Conference baseball tournament was held from May 27 through 29 at The Diamond in Richmond, Virginia, hosted by Virginia Commonwealth University. The annual tournament determined the tournament champion of Division I Atlantic 10 Conference in college baseball for the 2021 season. The tournament champion will then earn the conference's automatic bid to the 2021 NCAA Division I baseball tournament.

Tournament

Bracket

References

Tournament
Atlantic 10 Conference Baseball Tournament
Atlantic 10 Conference baseball tournament
Atlantic 10 Conference baseball tournament
Atlantic 10 Conference baseball tournament
Baseball in Virginia
College sports in Virginia
Sports in Richmond, Virginia
Sports competitions in Virginia
Tourist attractions in Richmond, Virginia